National Route 221 is a national highway of Japan connecting Hitoyoshi, Kumamoto and Miyakonojō, Miyazaki in Japan, with a total length of .

See also

References

221
Roads in Kumamoto Prefecture
Roads in Miyazaki Prefecture